BLUF may refer to:
 Balochistan Liberation United Front
 BLUF (fetishism) – Breeches and Leather Uniform Fanclub, a fraternal homosexual leather organization
 BLUF (communication) – an acronym for bottom line up front
 BLUF domain, a protein domain that senses blue light

See also
 Bluff (disambiguation)